This is primarily a  list of towns and cities in Australia by year of settlement. The article also contains information on permanent settlements established in Australia before British settlement commenced in 1788.

Pre-European settlements

Australia proper
For 40,000–70,000 years, the Australian mainland and Tasmania have been inhabited by the Australian Aboriginal people, and the Torres Strait Islands (now part of Queensland) by Torres Strait Islanders. Aboriginals were hunter-gatherers fire stick farmers who travelled between seasonal settlements inside country boundaries. Many groups had more permanent camps that they lived in for much of the year. Torres Strait Islanders engaged in some agriculture and had permanent villages. In 1788, the British Empire began colonising Australia, constructing permanent towns and farms. Aboriginal people began living in permanent settlements, some by choice while others were forced.

External territories
The Cocos-Keeling Islands and Christmas Island have only been inhabited since the 1880s. Information for them can be found in the table below. Norfolk Island was first settled by Polynesians in the 13th or 14th century. In 1788 the British colonised the island, by that time the Polynesians had been gone for hundreds of years. Jervis Bay Territory is located on the Australian mainland and has two small villages. Prior to British settlement, the area was inhabited by Yuin aboriginal people. The Coral Sea Islands, Heard Island and McDonald Islands and the Australian Antarctic Territory have never had permanent inhabitants, but do have weather and research stations where people temporarily live and work. The Ashmore and Cartier Islands have never been inhabited, but are regularly visited by traditional Indonesian fishers.

Former territories
From 1947 to 1966, Australia administered the island of Nauru, which has been inhabited for at least three thousand years. The Nauruan people traditionally lived in permanent villages. Nauru is now an independent sovereign country formally called the Republic of Nauru. Australia governed the Territory of New Guinea (1920–1941), Territory of Papua (1902–1945) and then the Territory of Papua and New Guinea (1945–1979), which were all located on the island of New Guinea. Many of the native Papuan people traditionally lived in permanent settlements. In 1979 these territories became the independent sovereign country of Papua New Guinea.

18th century

19th century

1800s

1810s

1820s

1830s

1840s

1850s

1860s

1870s

1880s

1890s

20th century

See also
 History of Australia
 List of cities by time of continuous habitation

Notes

References

Further reading
 

Australia history-related lists
Year of settlement
Year of settlement